The Autódromo Provincia de La Pampa is a  motor sports racing circuit in the town of Toay, in the La Pampa Province of Argentina, about  from the provincial capital, Santa Rosa.

Events

 Current
 February: TC Mouras, TC Pista Mouras
 March: Turismo Carretera, TC Pista
 November: Turismo Carretera, TC Pista

 Former
 TC2000 Championship (2013–2016, 2021)
 Top Race V6 (2013–2014)
 Turismo Nacional (2012–2019, 2021–2022)

Lap records 

The fastest official race lap records at the Autódromo Provincia de La Pampa are listed as:

References 

Autódromo Provincia de La Pampa
Autódromo Provincia de La Pampa
Autódromo Provincia de La Pampa